The A203 is a primary A road in South London.

Route
It runs from Brixton to Vauxhall connecting the A23 and A3 with Vauxhall Bridge, the Albert Embankment as well as the London Inner Ring Road for travel across the River Thames.

Stockwell Road
Between Brixton and Stockwell Underground station it is known as Stockwell Road, as the road leads up to/away from the area of Stockwell.

South Lambeth Road
North of here it is called South Lambeth Road because it passes through the area of South Lambeth. It travelles through the Little Portugal district before reaching it's northern terminus in Vauxhall, near the River Thames at Vauxhall Bridge.

Victoria line
It is roughly paralleled by TfL London Underground's Victoria line through its route.

External links

Roads in England
Streets in the London Borough of Lambeth